Nadezhda Grigoryevna Grekova (17 September 1910 – 6 January 2001) was a Soviet Belarusian politician. She was Chairman of the Supreme Soviet of the Belorussian SSR 1938–1949. Her office as Chairman of the Supreme Soviet nominally made her Head of the Republic. At some point she was known as the "Iron Lady".

Life
Grekova started to work in a textile factory in Minsk in 1922, at the age of twelve. In 1932, she became a member of the Communist Party of the Soviet Union, was elected chairperson of the local workers union in 1933. In 1937, at the age of twenty-seven, she was elected Deputy, and then Head of the Industrial and Transport Department of the Central Committee, and 3rd Secretary of the Central Committee of the Communist Party of Byelorussia. She held these positions until 1940.

From 25 July 1938 until 12 March 1949 she held the post of Chairman of the Supreme Soviet of the Belorussian SSR, one of the first women to hold such a position. She was only twenty-eight when elected to the position, making her one of the youngest female heads of state, as the position was the highest organ of state authority. This also made her Head of the Republic. The post was created after a re-organization of the system, and she was the first person elected to it. At the time, she had not yet completed her secondary education.

During the Occupation of Belarus by Nazi Germany, she was evacuated to Kazan. While in Kazan, she could not perform her duties as Chairman of The Supreme Soviet, but was elected as Secretary of the CPSU in Kazan in 1942–43. She was in Kazan from 28 June 1941 to 3 July 1944, and during this, while serving as Secretary of the Kazan CPSU, she was also Secretary of the Kazan City Committee of The CPSU. While there, she graduated from the Higher School of Party Organizers, under the Central Committee of the CPSU, completing her educational studies.

Nadezhda Grekova was a member of the Central Auditing Commission of the Communist Party of the Soviet Union 1939–52, Deputy Chairman of the Council of People's Commissars of the Byelorussian Soviet Socialist Republic in 1943–46. Deputy Minister of Food Industry of the Russian Socialist Federal Soviet Republic 1949–52, in addition, she was Minister of Food Industry of the Byelorussian Soviet Socialist Republic. From 1946 to 1955, she was a member of the Supreme Soviet of The Soviet Union.

She was awarded two Orders of Lenin, Order of the Patriotic War, First Class, Order of the Red Banner, the Order of the Badge of Honor and other medals.

In her private life, she was married to general Mikhail Malinin. It is alleged that the two of them were introduces to one another by Stalin.

Legacy
In 2002, a park in Minsk was named after her. As well, there is a museum dedicated to her.

References 

 http://www.guide2womenleaders.com/womeninpower/Womeninpower1900.htm
 http://knowbysight.info/GGG/02192.asp
 "Белорусская ССР – краткая энциклопедия", T. 5, "Биографический справочник", Минск 1982
 http://history.museum.by/be/node/14243
 https://translate.google.com/translate?hl=en&sl=be&u=http://www.nv-online.info/by/108/80/20340/%25E2%2580%259C%25D0%2596%25D0%25B0%25D0%25BB%25D0%25B5%25D0%25B7%25D0%25BD%25D0%25B0%25D1%258F-%25D0%25BB%25D0%25B5%25D0%25B4%25D0%25B7%25D1%2596%25E2%2580%259D-%25D0%259D%25D0%25B0%25D0%25B4%25D0%25B7%25D0%25B5%25D1%258F-%25D0%2593%25D1%2580%25D1%258D%25D0%25BA%25D0%25B0%25D0%25B2%25D0%25B0.htm&prev=search

External link

1910 births
2001 deaths
20th-century Belarusian women politicians
20th-century Belarusian politicians
Politicians from Minsk
People from Minsky Uyezd
Communist Party of the Soviet Union members
Second convocation members of the Soviet of the Union
Members of the Central Committee of the Communist Party of Byelorussia
People's commissars and ministers of the Byelorussian Soviet Socialist Republic
Members of the Supreme Soviet of the Byelorussian SSR (1938–1946)
Members of the Supreme Soviet of the Russian Soviet Federative Socialist Republic
Recipients of the Order of Lenin
Recipients of the Order of the Red Banner of Labour
Female heads of government
Soviet women in politics